The EMD GP15-1 is a 4-axle diesel-electric locomotive built by General Motors Electro-Motive Division between June 1976 and March 1982. Intended to provide an alternative to the rebuilding programs that many railroads were applying to their early road switchers, it is generally employed as a yard switcher or light road switcher. This locomotive is powered by a 12-cylinder EMD 645E engine, which generates .
A total of 310 units were built for American railroads. A number of GP15-1s remain in service today for yard work and light road duty. The radiator section is similar to those found on the EMD SD40T-2 and EMD SD45T-2 "tunnel motors," leading some observers to incorrectly identify the units as such or as GP15Ts, and giving them the nickname "baby tunnel motors".

Original Owners

Missouri Pacific Railroad
The Missouri Pacific Railroad purchased more units than the other three buyers combined. For spotting purposes, the MP models have a number of visually distinguishing features, though not all were applied consistently to the MP units:

 The MP units have a grab iron ladder mounted on both sides of the long hood end;
 MP's initial order of GP15-1s rode on Blomberg M trucks rather than the more common Blomberg B (all subsequent units were delivered with Blomberg B trucks) — and, while the standard Blomberg B truck carries two brake shoes per wheel, many MP units were equipped with only a single brake shoe per wheel;
 #1555–#1574 were outfitted with the standard 81" nose, while the remaining units (all built in December 1976 or later) came with an 88" nose;

Complete list

GP15T 
EMD built 28 examples of a variant, the GP15T, between October 1982 and April 1983. It was a very close cousin to the GP15-1, but used a turbocharger in order to generate more power from a smaller engine. Power was provided by an 8-cylinder diesel engine that generated , the same as the GP15-1, but with four fewer cylinders.

28 examples of this locomotive model were built for American railroads. The Chessie System received the majority of them as C&O 1500-1524 (25 units), while the rest went to the Apalachicola Northern in Florida as AN 720-722 (3 units).

GP15AC 
The GP15AC is a variant built between November and December 1982. This model differs from the GP15-1 due to Missouri Pacific specifying new AR10 AC alternators instead of rebuilt D32 DC generators. The only external difference between the GP15AC and the GP15-1 is a straight side sill (shared with the EMD GP15T) not related to the transmission difference.

34 examples of this locomotive model were built in total: 30 for Missouri Pacific Railroad, and four for Venezuela's IFE.

See also

 G16 and G16C and Victorian Railways X class (diesel) built in Australia

References

Further reading
 Sperandeo, Andy. "The EMD GP15-1: EMD's down-sized road switcher." Model Railroader, January 1990, 110–115.

External links

 Sarberenyi, Robert. EMD GP15-1, GP15AC, and GP15T Original Owners

B-B locomotives
GP15-1
Diesel-electric locomotives of the United States
Railway locomotives introduced in 1976
Freight locomotives
Standard gauge locomotives of the United States